Areraj is a town and a notified area in East Champaran district in the state of Bihar, India.
District entry point Mehsi City

Geography

It is just 30 KM away from Motihari. No train route is available to reach here, So to reach here one has to go by roadways only. Bus frequency is very good as after every 25minutes(approximately). Its takes around 30–35 minutes to reach Areraj. Areraj is an educational hub in East Champaran. We can say a mini BHU due to many educational institutions resided in single campus.

It is a spiritual city. It's a famous religious place like Jalpa Bhawani, Mansa Mata, Gaytri temple, 
Bhairav Mandir, Govindganj Ghat and most important "Someshwar Nath" temple is here, which is very very famous temple. In the month of Shravan (August), lot of Shiva's devotee come to visit this place & for whole month Officials have to make arrangements for the people as there is lot of rush during this auspicious month.

Rush increases even more on Monday and Friday, as these days are considered sacred day by Shiva's devotees. People believe that on these two days especially & in month of August particularly, whatever people wish to God is full filled.

Visiting places include 'Ashoka stambha', Lauria and 'Sri Someshwar Nath Mahadev Temple' etc.
Anshu goswami

Demographics
 India census, Areraj had a population of 26,014 with males constituting 52% of the population and females 48%. Areraj has an average literacy rate of 45%, lower than the national average of 59.5%; with 64% of males and 36% of females literate. 20% of the population is under 6 years of age. Areraj is going to connect on Indian Railway MAP through Hajipur-Sagauli proposed rail line.

Climate
Climate is characterised by high temperatures and evenly distributed precipitation throughout the year. The Köppen Climate Classification sub-type for this climate is "Cfa" (Humid Subtropical Climate).

References

Cities and towns in East Champaran district